Shurab-e Nusazi (also Romanized as Shūrāb-e Nūsāzī; also known as Shūr Āb) is a village in Pas Kalut Rural District, in the Central District of Gonabad County, Razavi Khorasan Province, Iran. At the 2006 census, its population was 168, in 64 families.

References 

Populated places in Gonabad County